In association football a goal may refer to:
The method of scoring in association football
The physical frame through which the ball must be put in order to score: see football_pitch#Goals